KK Vogošća is a professional basketball club from Vogošća, Bosnia and Herzegovina.  They currently play in the Basketball Championship of Bosnia and Herzegovina.

Trophies and awards
Bosnian A1 League (2nd-tier)
Winners (3): 2003–04, 2006–07, 2016–17

References

Basketball teams in Bosnia and Herzegovina